Hundvin or Hundven is a village in Alver municipality in Vestland county, Norway. The village is the site of Hundvin Church.

References

Villages in Vestland
Alver (municipality)